George Washington Brimhall ( – ) was a politician in Utah Territory. He was the father of George H. Brimhall.

Brimhall was the son of Sylvanus Brimhall and his wife the former Lydia Ann Guiteau. He was born along Canada Creek in the state of New York. In 1827, the family moved to Olean Point, New York and a short time later to Melville, Cattaraugus County, New York. After cutting and milling lumber at this location, the Brimhalls loaded it into a boat, went down the Allegany River to Pittsburgh and sold it, and then went down the Ohio to Dearborn County, Indiana. In 1837, Brimhall moved with his family to McHenry County, Illinois.

Brimhall joined the Church of Jesus Christ of Latter Day Saints in McHenry County in 1842. He spent the next two years as a Mormon missionary in McHenry and surrounding counties and then moved to Nauvoo, Illinois, in March 1844. Shortly afterwards, he moved to Knoxville, Illinois, where he met Lucretia Metcalf, whom he married in July 1845. Lucretia was opposed to going west with the Mormons. Brimhall hoped if he went to Utah he would be able to persuade her to come and join him with their three children. He left in 1850 but shortly after reaching Utah learned that she had divorced him and remarried.

Brimhall was sent to Iron County, Utah, in 1850 as part of the Iron Mission, one of the efforts coordinated by Brigham Young to facilitate the growth of Utah Territory's economy. In 1852, Brimhall was elected to the Utah Territorial Legislature, where he served for three terms. Early that year he married Rachel Ann Meyer.

In 1854, Brimhall moved to Ogden where he served on the City Council for three years.

Brimhall moved to Salt Lake City in 1863. In 1864, he was called to be part of the mission that settled St. George and vicinity. Brimhall later moved to Spanish Fork, where he lived until the time of his death.

Brimhall and his wife Rachel were the parents of ten children. He served for many years as a patriarch of the Utah Stake, which then included all of Utah County. He held this position at the time of his death.

References
Ernest L. Wilkinson, ed., Brigham Young University: The First 100 Years. (Provo: BYU Press, 1975) p. 331-332.
 pages 714-715
 page 325
 page 233
bio of George Washington Brimhall 
Orson F. Whitney. History of Utah: Biographical. p. 169-170.

1814 births
1895 deaths
19th-century American politicians
19th-century Mormon missionaries
American Mormon missionaries in the United States
American leaders of the Church of Jesus Christ of Latter-day Saints
Converts to Mormonism
Latter Day Saints from Illinois
Latter Day Saints from Utah
Members of the Utah Territorial Legislature
Mormon pioneers
Patriarchs (LDS Church)
People from Dearborn County, Indiana
People from McHenry County, Illinois
People from Olean, New York
People from Spanish Fork, Utah
Politicians from Ogden, Utah